Georg Mengel (1612 in Bamberg – 1667) was a German composer. After service in the army from 1640 he was Kapellmeister to Fürstbischof Melchior Otto Voit von Salzburg at the court of the Prince-Bishopric of Bamberg.

Works
Quinque limpidissimi lapides Davidici cum funda, seu Psalmi 51 cum Motetta centuplici varietate. 1644

References

German Baroque composers
1612 births
1667 deaths
17th-century classical composers
German male classical composers
German classical composers
17th-century male musicians